Snehithulu is a 1998 Indian Telugu-language romantic drama film directed by Muthyala Subbaiah and starring Vadde Naveen, Raasi, Sakshi Shivanand and Anand. The film was remade in Tamil as Aasaiyil Oru Kaditham (1999) and in Kannada as Sneha (2000).

Cast 

Vadde Naveen as Murali 
Raasi as Mahalaxmi
Sakshi Shivanand as Sirisha 
Anand as Vijay
Sudhakar
Ahuti Prasad as Anjanappa 
Narra Venkateswara Rao
Chalapathi Rao
Satyaprakash
Ranganath
Venu Madhav
 Tirupathi Prakash
 Bandla Ganesh 
 Kallu Chidambaram

Reception 
A critic from Deccan Herald opined that "But unlike other streotyped. mushy romances and action flicks, Snehitulu, which has its anchor in human relationships, emerges a winner, for it is shot imaginatively". A critic from Andhra Today wrote that "Although a routine story, Posani Krishna Murali lends it variety in its final twist. Good perfomances by the star cast combined with the director's prowess quite appeal to the audience".

Box office 
The film ran for a hundred days in Andhra Pradesh.

Awards
Nandi Awards
 Best Male Comedian  - Sudhakar

References 

Indian drama films
Telugu films remade in other languages